Lake Kronotskoye is a triangle-shaped lake located in Kamchatka Krai, Russia,  north of the Valley of Geysers and  away from the east coast of the Kamchatka Peninsula. It is named after the nearby volcano Kronotsky, part of the Eastern Range, whose name presumably derives from Itelmen krának, "high stone mountain." It was formed about 10,000 years ago when lava and pyroclastic flows from eruptions of the Kronotsky and Krasheninnikov volcanoes dammed the Kronotskaya River.

Lake Kronotskoye freezes over from late December to mid-May to a depth of one metre. It is a dimictic lake, reaching isothermy in July and late November. The water is cold even in summer, not exceeding  even at its warmest in September. The pH at the surface decreases from 8.7 to 8.0 during the growing season.

Massive rapids at the head of the Kronotskaya River prevent fish from entering or leaving the lake. Those that live in the lake are therefore of special scientific interest as model studies in microevolution processes. They comprise a population of landlocked sockeye or kokanee salmon and a group of char distinguished by its significant polymorphism and plasticity: researchers have identified between three and five different forms. Lake Kronotskoye is also well known for its population of swans.

The area surrounding the lake is uninhabited and protected as Kronotsky Nature Reserve, a component of the Volcanoes of Kamchatka World Heritage Site. The first Russians to reach the lake were the members of F.P. Ryabushinsky's Kamchatka expedition of 1908; the islands in the lake are named after them.

References

Lakes of Kamchatka Krai
Lava dammed lakes